Campro Production (CP) was a Cambodian film and Karaoke production company based in Phnom Penh that operated from 2003 to 2007.

History
The company was founded in early 2003 by a group of film students as a company that imported Asian horror films. Heng Tola was one of the producers. The company was formerly the owner of Kirirom Cinema, which closed in 2007 and was turned into a nightclub.

Their first film, Gratefulness, was inspired by the true life story of a young girl. The film has many similarities to Thai 1980s drama Walli.

The next movie was a period horror film called Neang Neath, which performed well at the Cambodia box office. The film was a remake of the Thai film Nang Nak. The company made several Karaoke as well in this period, but discontinued in late 2004 to concentrate on making movies.

The next projects were successful horror genre films such as The Forest, The Haunted House, and Ghost Banana Tree, the highest grossing film for the company.

Campro Productions received good press for their highly professional work and quality productions.

Despite the current taste for horror movies, Heng Tola believes a more serious trend is emerging, prompted in part by the resentment many Cambodians feel about their colonial past and toward domineering neighbours such as Thailand and Vietnam. The company produced some dramas and comedies, including Gratefulness, Motherless, Mr. Moa, The Wall of Love, and The Painter''' (film) but most failed at the box office. The Wall of Love was pulled from the screen after being screened for less than a week. The Painter was a minor success at the box office.

Campro Films closed in 2007, amid declining film viewership in the country.

Awards
Some of the films, including Gratefulness and The Forest, were nominated for awards at the Khmer national film festival.

 Filmography Gratefulness (2003)Neang Neath (2004)The Forest (2005)The Haunted House (2005)Motherless (2005)Ghost Banana Tree (2005)Mr. Moa (2005)Villa Horror (2006)The Game (2006)The Wall of Love (2006)The Konthong Keav Witch (2006)What Do You Scare Of (2007)Shock 24 Hours (2007)The Painter'' (2007)

References

External links 
Khmer.org
Gratefulness movie
Ghost Banana Tree
Tapei News

Cinema of Cambodia